Vasil Bici (born 20 January 1954) is an Albanian football coach.

References

1954 births
Living people
Albanian football managers
Besëlidhja Lezhë managers
Shkumbini Peqin managers
KF Vllaznia Shkodër managers
KF Bylis Ballsh managers
KF Teuta Durrës managers
FK Dinamo Tirana managers
Besa Kavajë managers
KS Kastrioti managers
KS Lushnja managers
Kategoria Superiore players
Kategoria Superiore managers